S. R. Crown Hall, designed by the German-American Modernist architect Ludwig Mies van der Rohe, is the home of the College of Architecture at the Illinois Institute of Technology in Chicago, Illinois.

History
Before the building of Crown Hall, the site was occupied by Mecca Flats. Originally built as a hotel for visitors to the World's Columbian Exposition, the building was converted to apartments and became home to mostly middle-class black families. Illinois Tech purchased the building in 1941 and razed it in 1952, after a decade-long legal fight with the tenants who aimed to prevent its destruction and their displacement. 

Ludwig Mies van der Rohe designed several dozen buildings for the southern side of the Illinois Institute of Technology. Most of these structures employ a brick and glass infill system within an exposed steel frame. When he was given the opportunity to design Crown Hall in 1950, Mies deviated from the norm and built a totally different structure which no one had seen before.

Widely regarded as one of Mies van der Rohe's masterpieces, Crown Hall, completed in 1956, is one of the most architecturally significant buildings of the 20th century Modernist movement. Crown Hall is considered architecturally significant because Mies van der Rohe refined the basic steel and glass construction style, beautifully capturing simplicity and openness for endless new uses. Creating this openness was achieved by the building having a suspended roof, without the need for interior columns. This created a universal space that could be endlessly adapted to new uses. Typically, older buildings up to 1956 had columns to support the roof, but Crown Hall does not require them. While designing Crown Hall, Mies stayed true to his famous words, "less is more" and he considered the building to be the best embodiment of the maxim. At the time Crown Hall was built, the idea of providing a single large room for the school of architecture and city planning's 300 students was to be particularly workable, and for students not to be isolated from others who may be further or less advanced in the course than them. Still, shortly after Crown Hall was built, architects began to question the relevancy of Mies' work. Many architects depicted Crown Hall as "slipping beneath the waves of Lake Michigan to a watery grave." But after a number of years, Crown Hall was seen as such a successful icon of modern architecture that it served as the foil for Chicago architect Stanley Tigerman's 1978 satirical collage, “The Titanic”. 

Mies once described his creation as being "almost nothing." With World War II and the Great Depression leaving a large break in construction, Mies reconstructed curriculum to appreciate minimalism and to focus on using only what was necessary; an approach not yet favorable in most architecture schools of the time.

Centrally located on the campus of the Illinois Institute of Technology, two miles south of downtown Chicago, Illinois, the building houses Illinois Tech's school of architecture, city planning, and the department of design. The two-level building is configured as a pure rectangular form, 220 ft. by 120 ft. by 18 ft. tall. The substructure is reinforced concrete, and is independent of the superstructure. The enclosed space is column-free with four six ft. steel plate girders welded to eight H-columns. These girders suspend the roof in a single plane to form a primary structure. While the lower level consists of compartmentalized rooms, the upper level occupies almost  50% of the total area of the building, but only includes one large, open classroom.

On March 27, 2012, Mies van der Rohe's 126th birthday, Google honored the architect and this icon of his achievement with a poetic doodle of Crown Hall.

Landmark status and renovation
S.R. Crown Hall was named a Chicago Landmark in 1997, a National Historic Landmark in 2001, and the remainder of the Illinois Tech Main Campus was entered into the National Register of Historic Places in 2005.

In August 2005, a major renovation was completed by Krueck and Sexton Architects, rescuing the building from years of lagging maintenance, enhancing its accessibility and functionality, improving overall energy and environmental performance, and restoring Crown close to its 1956 appearance.  The original 'Detroit graphite' lead paint was stripped from the structural steel and replaced with a lead-free black Tnemec urethane coating.  The glazing was completely replaced with panes and stops that meet current wind load requirements.  True sandblasted glass, original to the building but absent since a prior renovation, was installed in the lower panes.  The entire travertine-paved south terrace was replaced.  Interior wood partitions and storage lockers were refinished and resurfaced. Additionally, electrical and ethernet wiring was added to the main floor and restoration of the vents.

Notes

References
Keegan, Edward. Chicago Architecture 1885 to Today. New York : Universe Pub., 2008. Print. 
Raeburn, Michael. Architecture of the Western World. New York : Crescent Books, 1984. Print.
Zukowsky, John and Martha Thorne. Masterpieces of Chicago Architecture. Chicago : Art Institute of Chicago, 2004. Print.

External links

 Crown Hall page from Illinois Tech
 Google Doodle depicting Crown Hall
 Source Engine level depicting Crown Hall
High-resolution 360° Panoramas and Images of S. R. Crown Hall | Art Atlas

Illinois Institute of Technology
Ludwig Mies van der Rohe buildings
Buildings and structures on the National Register of Historic Places in Chicago
National Historic Landmarks in Chicago
University and college buildings completed in 1956
University and college buildings on the National Register of Historic Places in Illinois
1950s architecture in the United States
International style architecture in Illinois
Modernist architecture in Illinois
Chicago Landmarks